was a Japanese film actress.

Notable highlights of her career were an appearance in Akira Kurosawa's Stray Dog, and a role as Kimiko in The Bridges at Toko-Ri, in which she appeared alongside William Holden and Mickey Rooney.

Her first husband was Filipino musician and actor Rodrigo "Bimbo" Danao; they had two children together. Their eldest is actor Etsuo Shima.

Her second husband was Japanese actor Yorozuya Kinnosuke, but they divorced in 1987. Their eldest son, Akihiro, died in a car crash in 1990. In 2004, their youngest son, Kichinosuke Yorozuya (Satoshi Ida), was arrested for breaking into her home, for which he served six months in prison. On 16 June 2010, Kichinosuke committed suicide by jumping off her apartment in Shinjuku.

She died of esophageal cancer in Tokyo on 11 January 2014, aged 80.

Partial filmography 
She has appeared in more than 160 movies since 1949:

References

External links

AllCinema database 
Yahoo talent profile 

Japanese film actresses
1933 births
2014 deaths
Deaths from esophageal cancer
Actresses from Tokyo
Deaths from cancer in Japan
20th-century Japanese actresses
21st-century Japanese actresses